Shuanghuan Auto (officially Shijiazhuang Shuanghuan Automobile Co., Ltd.) (双环汽车) was a Chinese automobile manufacturer headquartered in Shijiazhuang, Hebei Province, founded by Zhao Zhigang. It was established in April 1988 and acquired the state-owned automobile manufacturer Red Star in 2002.

On 29 February 2016, China's Ministry of Industry and Information Technology shut down Shuanghuan and 12 other automobile manufacturers that did not meet mandatory production evaluations for two consecutive years.

The logo suspects to heavily copy the SsangYong badge (1992-2000).

Products
Shuanghuan Laifu/Shuanghuan Laiwang (来福/来旺) (HBJ6460) (1998–2003)
Shuanghuan Laibao (来宝) (1988–1998)/Shuanghuan Rabo S-RV (1999–2010)
Shuanghuan Jiaolian (1998–2002)
Shuanghuan SCEO/CEO (2004–2011)
Shuanghuan Noble/Bubble (2004–2016)
Shuanghuan SHZJ213 (1994–1997)

Shuanghuan and Wheego Electric Cars had a partnership for the production of electric cars. Jointly produced vehicles included:

Wheego Whip

Criticism
Shuanghuan was criticized and threatened with legal action for copying the Smart Fortwo and the BMW X5, along with the Honda CR-V. In Germany legal action was taken by BMW which resulted in a ban on sales of the Shuanghuan SCEO.

References

Car manufacturers of China
Vehicle manufacturing companies established in 1988
Vehicle manufacturing companies disestablished in 2016
Electric vehicle manufacturers of China
Defunct motor vehicle manufacturers of China